The 2011 Cricket World Cup warm-up matches were held prior to the 2011 Cricket World Cup, between February 12 and February 18, 2011. All 14 nations that were qualified to take part in the World Cup participated in a series of matches to prepare, experiment with different tactics and to help them acclimatise to conditions in the Indian Subcontinent. The warm-up matches were not classified as One Day Internationals by the International Cricket Council (ICC), despite sharing some of main features of this form of cricket, but some of the playing regulations were different from standard internationals in order to allow teams to experiment. For example, the main change allowed for thirteen different players to play in a match – nine players being allowed to both bat and bowl, with two only being able to bowl and two only being able to bat – instead of the eleven players normally allowed.

England, India, Sri Lanka and South Africa were the only teams to win both of their warm-up games, whilst Australia, Canada, Kenya and Zimbabwe did not win either of their fixtures.

Match status
As of 2007 none of the warm-up games were officially recognised as ODIs or List A matches by the International Cricket Council due to various changes in the rules of the game, this continued into the 2011 version of the world cup. While normally only 11 players are allowed to bat and field (excluding situations involving a substitute fielder), 13 players were used in each team's squad for the matches – 11 of whom were allowed to field at one time and 11 of whom were allowed to bat (meaning players could be swapped in and out when fielding or bowling, but two players did not bat in a match). In official ICC matches match referees are required to help officiate a game, but due to the changes in the rules none were appointed for any of the warm-up games. Additionally, Man of the Match awards were not given out and no reserve days were set for these matches.

Schedule and results

Saturday February 12, 2011

Sunday February 13, 2011

Tuesday February 15, 2011

Wednesday February 16, 2011

Friday February 18, 2011

Aggregate results

Note: Due to the change in the rules for these matches, the results did not have any effect on the ICC ODI Championship table or the ICC Associate ODI rankings.

References

Warm-Up Matches
Cricket World Cup matches